Juan Carlos Panameño Sifón (born April 12, 1977 in San Salvador, El Salvador) is a Salvadoran footballer

Club career
Nicknamed La Brujita (the little witch), Panameño came through the youth ranks at ADET and made his senior debut in 1998. In 2000, he had a short spell at Luis Ángel Firpo and when ADET sold him to Alianza he did not want to join them but instead trained with FAS, thus possibly disabling himself to play at the start of the 2001 Apertura. He finally joined FAS for whom he made his debut in a September 2001 4-0 win over Dragón. He scored 2 goals on his debut and went on to win 5 league titles with FAS, however he left the club at the end of 2005 due to limited playing opportunities. He joined Chalatenango, then Isidro Metapán before he ended up playing in the Salvadoran second division with Marte Soyapango (with whom he reached the Final of the second division B in 2009), Santa Tecla and Nejapa/Alacranes Del Norte.

International career
Panameño made his debut for El Salvador in a February 2000 friendly match against Honduras, coming on as a second half substitute for William Renderos, and has earned a total of just 2 caps, scoring no goals. His other and final international game was a July 2000 friendly match against Guatemala.

References

External links

1977 births
Living people
Sportspeople from San Salvador
Association football midfielders
Salvadoran footballers
El Salvador international footballers
C.D. Luis Ángel Firpo footballers
C.D. FAS footballers
C.D. Chalatenango footballers
A.D. Isidro Metapán footballers
Nejapa footballers
Santa Tecla F.C. footballers